Egor Viktorovich Silin (born 25 June 1988) is a Russian road racing cyclist, who last rode for UCI Continental team .

Silin left  at the end of the 2013 season, and rejoined  for the 2014 season; Silin had been with the squad prior to moving to Astana. He was named in the start list for the 2016 Giro d'Italia.

Major results

2007
2nd Gara Ciclistica Millionaria
2008
1st GP Citta di Felino
2nd Gara Ciclistica Millionaria
6th Piccolo Giro di Lombardia
7th Lombardia Tour
2009
1st Coppa della Pace
2nd GP Palio del Recioto
3rd Overall Giro della Valle d'Aosta
1st Stage 4
3rd Trofeo Alcide Degasperi
7th Giro del Belvedere
8th Overall Baby Giro
1st Stage 7
2011
1st Stage 4 Herald Sun Tour
6th Tre Valli Varesine
2014
8th Overall Tour Méditerranéen
10th Overall Tour Down Under
2015
6th Overall Tour of Austria
1st Prologue
2016
7th Gran Premio Miguel Indurain

Grand Tour general classification results timeline

References

External links

Team Katusha bio

1988 births
Living people
People from Ishim, Tyumen Oblast
Russian male cyclists
Sportspeople from Tyumen Oblast